Vidaković (Serbian Cyrillic: Видаковић) is a South Slavic surname derived from Vidak and Vida family names. It is associated with Serbs, Croats, Bunjevci and Montenegrins ethnic groups and is commonly found in present-day Bosnia and Herzegovina, Croatia and Serbia. 

It may refer to the following people:
Albe Vidaković (1914–1964) Croatian composer, catholic priest and musicologist 
Mirko Vidaković (1924–2002), Croatian botanist
Risto Vidaković (born 1969), Serbian footballer and manager
Igor Vidaković (born 1983), Croatian footballer
Nemanja Vidaković (born 1985), Serbian footballer
Milovan Vidaković (1780-1841), Serbian novelist
Branislav (Branko, Bane) Vidaković (born 1959) Serbian actor

See also
Vida (disambiguation)
Vidak

Croatian surnames
Serbian surnames